The Game is a 2022 Sri Lankan Sinhala action thriller film directed by Suranga de Alwis and produced by Nishantha Weerasinghe for Sangeetha Films, and distributed by A4Movie. The film stars Ranjan Ramanayake, Sriyantha Mendis and Janith Wickramage in lead roles, whereas Buddhika Jayaratne, Dhananjaya Siriwardena and Wasantha Kumaravila made supportive roles. The film revolves around an extremist who started to assassinate a powerful aristocrat, where the theme loosely based on April 21 Easter Sunday Bombings occurred in Sri Lanka.

Plot
Ajay and Vijay are two friends. They work in the police station under the OIC named Samaradiwakara. One day, an emergency phone call to Samaradiwakara says that Ajay has an information about a mysterious murder. Since Ajay was not at the police station at the time and the importance of the information, Samaradiwakara ordered Vijay to appear as Ajay and obtain the information. Reluctantly, Vijay agrees and goes to meet Ganga, who made the phone call as Ajay. There Vijay gets to know some very important information. That is, the main suspect wanted in connection with an assassination planned by an extremist gang is identified across Ganga. Meanwhile, a lady detective named Jenny pursues the extremist leader Siam. According to the information obtained by Siam and Vijay, the security forces were able to nab the main suspect wanted by the intelligence unit. Meanwhile, Vijay starts a love affair with Ganga and Ajay starts a love affair with Vijay's sister. One day Vijay is killed while this is happening. Extremist leader Siam brings Tiger with his daughter from Nuwara Eliya to Colombo to pursue his goal. Tiger behaves in such a way as to make it difficult for Siam to reach his goal as Siam prepares to assassinate a powerful aristocrat through Tiger. The film then revolves with the mission to catch Tiger.

Cast
 Ranjan Ramanayake as Vijay
 Janith Wickramage as Ajay Gunasekara
 Sriyantha Mendis as OIC Samaradiwakara
 Buddhika Jayaratne
 Dhananjaya Siriwardena
 Wasantha Kumaravila as Siam
 Tharindi Fernando as Ganga, Vijay's girlfriend
 Chathu Rajapaksa as Chathu Nanayakkara, Ajay's girlfriend 
 Sando Harris as Tiger
 Ariyasena Gamage
 Lakshman Amarasekara
 Nilmini Kottegoda
 Jeevan Sapnaranga
 Dulashi Nimandi
 Thushini Fernando
 Geethika Rajapaksa
 Tyrone Michael
 Gayan Mapalagama
 Sudesh Wasantha Peiris
 Samantha Ranga Mayadunne
 Anura Samarajeewa
 Saman Padmakumara
 Sumedha Mihiraj

Production
The film marked the fifth cinema direction by Suranga de Alwis. Nadeesha Samith Dias is writing this story based on the April attack when the main script of the film was written by Nishantha Weerasinghe. The cinematographer is Gamini Moragollagama, whereas editing done by Ruwan Weerasinghe, art direction by Eheliyagoda Somathilaka, and Chandrara Sugath Kumara handled costumes. Stunt director is Samantha Mayadunna, and costume designer is Priyan Anura Sri. Still photography by Anura Shantha, production management by Dharshana Dissanayake and Sampath Alwis, executive production by Nishantha Weerasinghe and director's father, Sarath de Alwis joined with music direction. Uresha Ravihari, Mario Ananda and Sanka Dineth are the singers of the film. Meanwhile, director Suranga's son Jeevan Saptharanga and daughter Dulashi Nimnadi are also acting in the film.

The trailer of the film was released at the Colombo City Center and simultaneously released the film songs on 20 December 2021.

Screening
The film is scheduled to be released islandwide on the 20th, but it has been suspended due to the prevailing economic crisis in the country according to the film director Suranga de Alwis. The main reason was due to fuel shortages and power cuts in the country, making it difficult to operate generators and some cinemas not having generators. The film was later released on 16 June 2022 in 70 cinemas where the premiere was held at 6 p.m. at the Liberty Cinema. This is lead actor Ranjan Ramanayake's last film before he was imprisoned. The film will be on display in Melbourne, Australia on 24 June 2022 and will be screened in New Zealand, USA, and Cannes, Italy.

The film surpassed 50 days of screen with a huge success in theaters across the country. The film received mixed review from critics, and highlighted the need for a formal screenplay and editing style as well as a star-studded actress opposite to Ranjan Ramanayake.

Soundtrack
The film consists of three songs including the first item song in Sinhala cinema.

References

External links
 "The Game" on Sinhala Cinema Database
 

2022 films
2020s Sinhala-language films
2022 thriller films
Sri Lankan thriller films
Films directed by Suranga de Alwis